Cnesteboda is a genus of moths belonging to the family Tortricidae.

Species
Cnesteboda anisocornutana (Razowski, 1964)
Cnesteboda assamica (Razowski, 1964)
Cnesteboda celligera (Meyrick, 1918)
Cnesteboda davidsoni Razowski, 2000
Cnesteboda facilis (Meyrick, 1912)
Cnesteboda haruspex (Meyrick, 1912)
Cnesteboda musculus (Diakonoff, 1948)
Cnesteboda oenina (Diakonoff, 1976)
Cnesteboda spinosa (Diakonoff, 1948)
Cnesteboda variabilis (Diakonoff, 1941)

See also
List of Tortricidae genera

References

 , 2005: World Catalogue of Insects vol. 5 Tortricidae.
 , 1990: Descriptions and notes on tropical Tortricini (Lepidoptera: Tortricidae). Acta Zoologica Cracoviensia 33 (28): 575–594.

External links
tortricidae.com

Tortricini
Tortricidae genera
Taxa named by Józef Razowski